Randy Vulakovich is an American politician who served as a member of the Pennsylvania State Senate for the 38th district from January 6, 2015 to January 1, 2019. He previously served in the 40th legislative district. He was elected in a special election on August 7, 2012. Vulakovich was reelected to a full term in 2014 in the newly-established 38th district. In May 2018, he lost re-nomination to that seat in the Republican primary to Ross commissioner Jeremy Shaffer.

Education 
Prior to holding elected office, Vulakovich attended the Allegheny County Police Academy and Duquesne University.

Career
He served as a police sergeant with the Shaler Township Police Department, where he was known as "Officer V."

On April 11, 2006, Democrat Shawn Flaherty defeated Republican Mike Dolan in a special election to fill the remainder of Jeff Habay's term as state representative. On May 16, 2006, Vulakovich defeated two other Republicans (including Mike Dolan) for the right to challenge Flaherty in that November's election. Vulakovich defeated Flaherty that November by a 53-47 margin. Vulakovich resigned from the State House on August 29, 2012, just prior to taking the oath of office to begin his Senate service.

In 2012 he defeated former Congresswoman Melissa Hart in the primary, leading to Vulakovich being nominated by the Republican party to face Sharon Brown to fill the vacancy in Pennsylvania's 40th State Senate district created by the resignation of Jane Orie. He was elected to the seat in the August 7, 2012, special election with over 73% of the vote to Brown's 27%. In the wake of his election, Vulakovich announced he would resign his State House seat to assume his seat in the State Senate. Vulakovich was sworn in as a state senator on August 29, 2012.

For most of his tenure, Vulakovich represented Pittsburgh's 11th and 12th wards; he was the only elected Republican representing any portion of Pittsburgh above the county level.

References

External links

Pennsylvania State Senate - Randy Vulakovich - Official PA Senate website
Pennsylvania Senator Randy Vulakovich - Official Party website

Year of birth missing (living people)
Living people
American municipal police officers
Duquesne University alumni
Republican Party Pennsylvania state senators
People from Allegheny County, Pennsylvania
21st-century American politicians
Republican Party members of the Pennsylvania House of Representatives